The Shining Path, officially the Communist Party of Peru (abbr. PCP), is a communist guerrilla group in Peru following Marxism–Leninism–Maoism and Gonzalo Thought. Academics often refer to the group as the Communist Party of Peru – Shining Path (abbr. PCP-SL) to distinguish it from other communist parties in Peru.

When it first launched its "people's war" in 1980, the Shining Path's goal was to overthrow the government through guerrilla warfare and replace it with a New Democracy. The Shining Path believed that by establishing a dictatorship of the proletariat, inducing a cultural revolution, and eventually sparking a world revolution, they could arrive at full communism. Their representatives stated that the then-existing socialist countries were revisionist, and the Shining Path was the vanguard of the world communist movement. The Shining Path's ideology and tactics have influenced other Maoist insurgent groups such as the Communist Party of Nepal (Maoist Centre) and other Revolutionary Internationalist Movement-affiliated organizations.

The Shining Path has been widely condemned for its brutality, including violence deployed against peasants, trade union organizers, competing Marxist groups, elected officials and the general public. The Shining Path is regarded as a terrorist organization by Peru, Japan, the United States, the European Union, and Canada, all of whom consequently prohibit funding and other financial support to the group.

Since the captures of Shining Path founder Abimael Guzmán in 1992 and his successors Óscar Ramírez in 1999 and Comrade Artemio in 2012, the Shining Path has declined in activity. Only one remaining faction of the Shining Path, the Militarized Communist Party of Peru (MPCP), is active in the Valle de los Ríos Apurímac, Ene y Mantaro (VRAEM) region of Peru, and it has since distanced itself from the Shining Path's legacy in 2018 in order to maintain the support of peasants previously persecuted by the Shining Path.

Name 
The common name of this group, the Shining Path, distinguishes it from several other Peruvian communist parties with similar names . The name is derived from a maxim of José Carlos Mariátegui, the founder of the original Peruvian Communist Party (from which the rest of communist parties split; now commonly known as the "PCP-Unidad") in the 1920s: "" ("Marxism–Leninism will open the shining path to revolution").

This maxim was featured on the masthead of the newspaper of a Shining Path front group. Due to the number of Peruvian groups that refer to themselves as the Communist Party of Peru, groups are often distinguished by the names of their publications. The followers of this group are generally called senderistas. All documents, periodicals, and other materials produced by the organization are signed as the Communist Party of Peru (PCP).

Organization 
The Shining Path splintered into several groups following its collapse in support. In 1999, brothers Víctor and Jorge Quispe Palomino split from the Shining Path and established the Militarized Communist Party of Peru (MPCP), which consists of about 450 individuals who remained in the Valle de los Ríos Apurímac, Ene y Mantaro (VRAEM) region. The group allegedly obtains its revenue from cocaine trafficking. The MPCP has attempted to recharacterize and distance itself from the original Shining Path groups that had attacked rural communities in the area, describing Abimael Guzman as a "traitor".

The Shining Path primarily comprises two groups and their sub-branches; the People's Guerrilla Army and United Front.

People's Guerrilla Army 

The People's Guerrilla Army (EGP) was created for the purposes of combat, mobilization and producing an income for Shining Path. The Army was officially created on 3 December 1982. Recently the EGP has made money from selling cigarettes, clothes, candy, competitions and other methods.

The EGP structure is made of the following:
 Main Force (FP): Mainly armed with larger weapons, such as the AKM and FN FAL rifles as well as the Heckler & Koch HK21 machine gun. Due to proficiency in armaments, this group is tasked with ambushing police and soldiers. They do not remain in locations, usually traveling across regions.
 Local Force (FL): These members are local agricultural workers who are provided minor weapons and periodically assist FP members, then later return to their work. Skilled FL members are moved into the FP's ranks.
 Base Force (FB): Some of the peasants of territories captured by the Shining Path are grouped into the FB, typically serving as reservists armed with handheld weapons such as knives, spears and machetes. FB members occasionally serve in surveillance tasks.

United Front 
The United Front serves as the political and bureaucratic arm of the Shining Path. It has two main branches: the Movement for Amnesty and Fundamental Rights (MOVADEF) and the Front for Unity and Defense of the Peruvian People (FUDEPP).

The Movement for Amnesty and Fundamental Rights (MOVADEF) was created on 20 November 2009 when Alfredo Crespo, the defense lawyer of Abimael Guzmán, and fifteen others gathered. MOVADEF has three sub-branches; the Central Historical Committee, the Provisional Central Committee and the National Executive Committee (CEN). The branch filed to become a political party in Peru with the National Jury of Elections (JNE) in 2011, though the application was denied. The Peruvian government has accused MOVADEF of advocating terrorism.

The Front for Unity and Defense of the Peruvian People (FUDEPP) was created in 2015. In association with MOVADEF, the group announced that it had 73 provincial committees and allegedly received 400,000 to 500,000 signatures for the JNE to participate in the 2016 Peruvian general election. They were ultimately prevented from participating in the elections.

History

Origins 

The Shining Path was founded in 1969 by Abimael Guzmán, a former university philosophy professor (his followers referred to him by his nom de guerre Presidente Gonzalo), and a group of 11 others. Guzmán was heavily influenced by a trip to China and admired the teachings of Mao Zedong. His teachings created the foundation of its militant Maoist doctrine. It was an offshoot of the Peruvian Communist Party – Red Flag, which itself split from the original Peruvian Communist Party founded by José Carlos Mariátegui in 1928.

Antonio Díaz Martínez, an agronomist who became a leader of the Shining Path, made several important contributions to the group's ideology. In his books Ayacucho, Hambre y Esperanza (1969) and China, La Revolución Agraria (1978), he expressed his own conviction of the necessity that revolutionary activity in Peru follow strictly the teachings of Mao Zedong.

The Shining Path first established a foothold at San Cristóbal of Huamanga University, in Ayacucho, where Guzmán taught philosophy. The university had recently reopened after being closed for about half a century, and many students of the newly educated class adopted the Shining Path's radical ideology. Between 1973 and 1975, Shining Path members gained control of the student councils at the Universities of Huancayo and La Cantuta, and they also developed a significant presence at the National University of Engineering in Lima and the National University of San Marcos. Sometime later, it lost many student elections in the universities, including Guzmán's San Cristóbal of Huamanga. It decided to abandon recruitment at the universities and reconsolidate.

Guzmán believed that communism required a "popular war" and distanced himself from organizing workers. Beginning on 17 March 1980, the Shining Path held a series of clandestine meetings in Ayacucho, known as the Central Committee's second plenary. It formed a "Revolutionary Directorate" that was political and military in nature and ordered its militias to transfer to strategic areas in the provinces to start the "armed struggle". The group also held its "First Military School", where members were instructed in military tactics and the use of weapons. They also engaged in "Criticism and Self-criticism", a Maoist practice intended to purge bad habits and avoid the repetition of mistakes. During the existence of the First Military School, members of the Central Committee came under heavy criticism. Guzmán did not, and he emerged from the First Military School as the clear leader of the Shining Path.

1980s: The People's War 

By 1980, Shining Path had about 500 members. When Peru's military government allowed elections for the first time in twelve years in 1980, the Shining Path was one of the few leftist political groups that declined to take part. It chose instead to begin a guerrilla war in the highlands of the Ayacucho Region. On 17 May 1980, on the eve of the presidential elections, it burned ballot boxes in the town of Chuschi. It was the first "act of war" by the Shining Path. The perpetrators were quickly caught, and additional ballots were shipped to Chuschi. The elections proceeded without further problems, and the incident received little attention in the Peruvian press.

Throughout the 1980s, the Shining Path grew both in terms of the territory it controlled and in the number of militants in its organization, particularly in the Andean highlands. It gained support from local peasants by filling the political void left by the central government and providing what they called "popular justice", public trials that disregard any legal and human rights that deliver swift and brutal sentences including public executions. This caused the peasantry of some Peruvian villages to express some sympathy for the Shining Path, especially in the impoverished and neglected regions of Ayacucho, Apurímac, and Huancavelica. At times, the civilian population of small, neglected towns participated in popular trials, especially when the victims of the trials were widely disliked.

The Shining Path's credibility benefited from the government's initially tepid response to the insurgency. For over a year, the government refused to declare a state of emergency in the region where the Shining Path was operating. The Interior Minister, José María de la Jara, believed the group could be easily defeated through police actions. Additionally, the president, Fernando Belaúnde Terry, who returned to power in 1980, was reluctant to cede authority to the armed forces since his first government had ended in a military coup. The result was that the peasants in the areas where the Shining Path was active thought the state was either impotent or not interested in their issues.

On 29 December 1981, the government declared an "emergency zone" in the three Andean regions of Ayacucho, Huancavelica, and Apurímac and granted the military the power to arbitrarily detain any suspicious person. The military abused this power, arresting scores of innocent people, at times subjecting them to torture during interrogation as well as rape. Members of the Peruvian Armed Forces began to wear black ski-masks to hide their identities, in order to protect themselves and their families.

In some areas, the military trained peasants and organized them into anti-rebel militias, called "rondas". They were generally poorly equipped, despite being provided arms by the state. The rondas would attack the Shining Path guerrillas, with the first such reported attack occurring in January 1983, near Huata. Ronderos would later kill 13 guerrilla fighters in February 1983, in Sacsamarca. In March 1983, ronderos brutally killed Olegario Curitomay, one of the commanders of the town of Lucanamarca. They took him to the town square, stoned him, stabbed him, set him on fire, and finally shot him. The Shining Path's retaliation to this was one of the worst attacks in the entire conflict, with a group of guerrilla members entering the town and going house by house, killing dozens of villagers, including babies, with guns, hatchets, and axes. This action has come to be known as the Lucanamarca massacre. Additional massacres of civilians by the Shining Path would occur throughout the conflict.

The Shining Path's attacks were not limited to the countryside. It executed several attacks against the infrastructure in Lima, killing civilians in the process. In 1983, it sabotaged several electrical transmission towers, causing a citywide blackout, and set fire and destroyed the Bayer industrial plant. That same year, it set off a powerful bomb in the offices of the governing party, Popular Action. Escalating its activities in Lima, in June 1985, it blew up electricity transmission towers in Lima, producing a blackout, and detonated car bombs near the government palace and the justice palace. It was believed to be responsible for bombing a shopping mall. At the time, President Fernando Belaúnde Terry was receiving the Argentine president Raúl Alfonsín.

During this period, the Shining Path assassinated specific individuals, notably leaders of other leftist groups, local political parties, labor unions, and peasant organizations, some of whom were anti-Shining Path Marxists. On 24 April 1985, in the midst of presidential elections, it tried to assassinate Domingo García Rada, the president of the Peruvian National Electoral Council, severely injuring him and mortally wounding his driver. In 1988, Constantin (Gus) Gregory, an American citizen working for the United States Agency for International Development, was assassinated. Two French aid workers were killed on 4 December that same year.

Level of support 
By 1990, the Shining Path had about 3,000 armed members at its greatest extent. The group had gained control of much of the countryside of the center and south of Peru and had a large presence in the outskirts of Lima. The Shining Path began to fight against Peru's other major guerrilla group, the Túpac Amaru Revolutionary Movement (MRTA), as well as campesino self-defense groups organized by the Peruvian armed forces.

The Shining Path quickly seized control of large areas of Peru. The group had significant support among peasant communities, and it had the support of some slum dwellers in the capital and elsewhere. The Shining Path's interpretation of Maoism did not have the support of many city dwellers. According to opinion polls, only 15 percent of the population considered subversion to be justifiable in June 1988, while only 17 percent considered it justifiable in 1991. In June 1991, "the total sample disapproved of the Shining Path by an 83 to 7 percent margin, with 10 percent not answering the question. Among the poorest, however, only 58 percent stated disapproval of the Shining Path; 11 percent said they had a favorable opinion of the Shining Path, and some 31 percent would not answer the question." A September 1991 poll found that 21 percent of those polled in Lima believed that the Shining Path did not torture and kill innocent people. The same poll found that 13 percent believed that society would be more just if the Shining Path won the war and 22 percent believed society would be equally just under the Shining Path as it was under the government. Polls have never been completely accurate since Peru has several anti-terrorism laws, including "apology for terrorism", that makes it a punishable offense for anyone who does not condemn the Shining Path. In effect, the laws make it illegal to support the group in any way.

Many peasants were unhappy with the Shining Path's rule for a variety of reasons, such as its disrespect for indigenous culture and institutions. However, they had also made agreements and alliances with some indigenous tribes. Some did not like the brutality of its "popular trials" that sometimes included "slitting throats, strangulation, stoning, and burning." Peasants were offended by the rebels' injunction against burying the bodies of Shining Path victims.

The Shining Path followed Mao Zedong's dictum that guerrilla warfare should start in the countryside and gradually choke off the cities. The Shining Path banned continuous drunkenness, but they did allow the consumption of alcohol.

According to multiple sources, the Shining Path received support from Gaddafi's Libya.

1990s: The Fujimori government 

When President Alberto Fujimori took office in 1990, he responded to Shining Path with repressive force. His government issued a law in 1991 that gave the rondas a legal status, and from that time, they were officially called Comités de auto defensa ("Committees of Self-Defense"). They were officially armed, usually with 12-gauge shotguns, and trained by the Peruvian Army. According to the government, there were approximately 7,226 comités de auto defensa as of 2005; almost 4,000 are located in the central region of Peru, the stronghold of the Shining Path.

The Peruvian government also cracked down on the Shining Path in other ways. Military personnel were dispatched to areas dominated by the Shining Path, especially Ayacucho, to fight the rebels. Ayacucho, Huancavelica, Apurímac and Huánuco were declared emergency zones, allowing for some constitutional rights to be suspended in those areas.

Initial government efforts to fight the Shining Path were not very effective or promising. Military units engaged in many human rights violations, which caused the Shining Path to appear in the eyes of many as the lesser of two evils. They used excessive force, tortured individuals accused of being sympathizers and killed many innocent civilians. Government forces destroyed villages and killed campesinos suspected of supporting the Shining Path. They eventually lessened the pace at which the armed forces committed atrocities such as massacres. Additionally, the state began the widespread use of intelligence agencies in its fight against the Shining Path. However, atrocities were committed by the National Intelligence Service and the Army Intelligence Service, notably the La Cantuta massacre, the Santa massacre and the Barrios Altos massacre, which were committed by Grupo Colina.

In one of its last attacks in Lima, on 16 July 1992, Shining Path detonated a powerful bomb on Tarata Street in the Miraflores District, full of civilian adults and children, killing 25 people and injuring an additional 155.

Capture of Guzmán and collapse 
On 12 September 1992,  (GEIN) captured Guzmán and several Shining Path leaders in an apartment above a dance studio in the Surquillo district of Lima. GEIN had been monitoring the apartment since a number of suspected Shining Path militants had visited it. An inspection of the garbage of the apartment produced empty tubes of a skin cream used to treat psoriasis, a condition that Guzmán was known to have. Shortly after the raid that captured Guzmán, most of the remaining Shining Path leadership fell as well.

The capture of Guzmán left a huge leadership vacuum for the Shining Path. "There is no No. 2. There is only Presidente Gonzalo and then the party," a Shining Path political officer said at a birthday celebration for Guzmán in Lurigancho prison in December 1990. "Without President Gonzalo, we would have nothing."

At the same time, the Shining Path suffered embarrassing military defeats to self-defense organizations of rural campesinos — supposedly its social base. When Guzmán called for peace talks with the Peruvian government, the organization fractured into splinter groups, with some Shining Path members in favor of such talks and others opposed.

Guzmán's role as the leader of the Shining Path was taken over by Óscar Ramírez, who himself was captured by Peruvian authorities in 1999. After Ramírez's capture, the group further splintered, guerrilla activity diminished sharply, and peace returned to the areas where the Shining Path had been active. The two remaining splinter groups were a collective in Huallaga Valley led by Comrade Artemio and the Militarized Communist Party of Peru (MPCP) led by the Víctor and Jorge Quispe Palomino brothers.

2000s: Temporary resurgence 
Although the organization's numbers had lessened by 2003, a militant faction of the Shining Path called Proseguir ("Onward") continued to be active. The group had allegedly made an alliance with the Revolutionary Armed Forces of Colombia (FARC) in the early 2000s, learning how to use rockets against aircraft.

On 20 March 2002, a car bomb exploded outside the US embassy in Lima just before a visit by President George W. Bush. Nine people were killed, and 30 were injured; the attack was suspected to be the work of the Shining Path.

On 9 June 2003, a Shining Path group attacked a camp in Ayacucho and took 68 employees of the Argentinian company Techint and three police guards as hostages. They had been working on the Camisea gas pipeline project that would take natural gas from Cusco to Lima. According to sources from Peru's Interior Ministry, the rebels asked for a sizable ransom to free the hostages. Two days later, after a rapid military response which involved a signals intelligence aircraft from the Brazilian Air Force, the rebels abandoned the hostages; according to government sources, no ransom was paid. However, there were rumors that US$200,000 was paid to the rebels.

Government forces have captured three leading Shining Path members. In April 2000, Commander José Arcela Chiroque, called "Ormeño", was captured, followed by another leader, Florentino Cerrón Cardozo, called "Marcelo", in July 2003. In November of the same year, Jaime Zuñiga, called "Cirilo" or "Dalton", was arrested after a clash in which four guerrillas were killed and an officer was wounded. Officials said he took part in planning the kidnapping of the Techint pipeline workers. He was also thought to have led an ambush against an army helicopter in 1999 in which five soldiers died.

In 2003, the Peruvian National Police broke up several Shining Path training camps and captured many members and leaders. By late October 2003, there were 96 terrorist incidents in Peru, projecting a 15% decrease from the 134 kidnappings and armed attacks in 2002. Also for the year, eight or nine people were killed by the Shining Path, and 6 senderistas were killed and 209 were captured.

In January 2004, a man known as Comrade Artemio and identifying himself as one of the Shining Path's leaders, said in a media interview that the group would resume violent operations unless the Peruvian government granted amnesty to other top Shining Path leaders within 60 days. Peru's Interior Minister, Fernando Rospigliosi, said that the government would respond "drastically and swiftly" to any violent action. In September that same year, a comprehensive sweep by police in five cities found 17 suspected members. According to the interior minister, eight of the arrested were school teachers and high-level school administrators.

Despite these arrests, the Shining Path continued to exist in Peru. On 22 December 2005, the Shining Path ambushed a police patrol in the Huánuco region, killing eight. Later that day, they wounded an additional two police officers. In response, then President Alejandro Toledo declared a state of emergency in Huánuco and gave the police the power to search houses and arrest suspects without a warrant. On 19 February 2006, the Peruvian police killed Héctor Aponte, believed to be the commander responsible for the ambush. In December 2006, Peruvian troops were sent to counter renewed guerrilla activity, and according to high-level government officials, the Shining Path's strength has reached an estimated 300 members. In November 2007, police said they killed Artemio's second-in-command, a guerrilla known as JL.

In September 2008, government forces announced the killing of five rebels in the Vizcatan region. This claim was subsequently challenged by the APRODEH, a Peruvian human rights group, which believed that those who were killed were in fact local farmers and not rebels. That same month, Artemio gave his first recorded interview since 2006. In it, he stated that the Shining Path would continue to fight despite escalating military pressure. In October 2008, in Huancavelica Region, the guerrillas engaged a military convoy with explosives and firearms, demonstrating their continued ability to strike and inflict casualties on military targets. The conflict resulted in the death of 12 soldiers and two to seven civilians. It came one day after a clash in the Vizcatan region, which left five rebels and one soldier dead.

In November 2008, the rebels utilized hand grenades and automatic weapons in an assault that claimed the lives of 4 police officers. In April 2009, the Shining Path ambushed and killed 13 government soldiers in Ayacucho. Grenades and dynamite were used in the attack. The dead included eleven soldiers and one captain, and two soldiers were also injured, with one reported missing. Poor communications were said to have made relay of the news difficult. The country's Defense Minister, Antero Flores Aráoz, said many soldiers "plunged over a cliff". His Prime Minister, Yehude Simon, said these attacks were "desperate responses by the Shining Path in the face of advances by the armed forces" and expressed his belief that the area would soon be freed of "leftover terrorists". In the aftermath, a Sendero leader called this "the strongest [anti-government] blow... in quite a while". In November 2009, Defense Minister Rafael Rey announced that Shining Path militants had attacked a military outpost in southern Ayacucho province. One soldier was killed and three others wounded in the assault.

2010s: Capture of Artemio and continued downfall 
On 28 April 2010, Shining Path rebels in Peru ambushed and killed a police officer and two civilians who were destroying coca plantations of Aucayacu, in the central region of Haunuco, Peru. The victims were gunned down by sniper fire coming from the thick forest as more than 200 workers were destroying coca plants. Following the attack, the Shining Path faction, based in the Upper Huallaga Valley of Peru and headed by Florindo Eleuterio Flores Hala, alias Comrade Artemio, was operating in survival mode and lost 9 of their top 10 leaders to Peruvian National Police-led capture operations. Two of the eight leaders were killed by PNP personnel during the attempted captures. The nine arrested or killed Shining Path (Upper Huallaga Valley faction) leaders include Mono (Aug. 2009), Rubén (May 2010), Izula (Oct. 2010), Sergio (Dec. 2010), Yoli/Miguel/Jorge (Jun. 2011), Gato Larry (Jun. 2011), Oscar Tigre (Aug. 2011), Vicente Roger (Aug. 2011), and Dante/Delta (Jan. 2012). This loss of leadership, coupled with a sweep of Shining Path (Upper Huallaga Valley) supporters executed by the PNP in November 2010, prompted Comrade Artemio to declare in December 2011 to several international journalists that the guerrilla war against the Peruvian Government has been lost and that his only hope was to negotiate an amnesty agreement with the Government of Peru.

On 12 February 2012, Comrade Artemio was found badly wounded after a clash with troops in a remote jungle region of Peru. President Ollanta Humala said the capture of Artemio marked the defeat of the Shining Path in the Alto Huallaga valley – a center of cocaine production. President Humala has stated that he would now step up the fight against the remaining bands of Shining Path rebels in the Ene-Apurímac valley. Walter Diaz, the lead candidate to succeed Artemio, was captured on 3 March, further ensuring the disintegration of the Alto Huallaga valley faction. On 3 April 2012, Jaime Arenas Caviedes, a senior leader in the group's remnants in Alto Huallaga Valley who was also regarded to be the leading candidate to succeed Artemio following Diaz's arrest, was captured. After Caviedes, alias "Braulio", was captured, Humala declared that the Shining Path was now unable to operate in the Alto Huallaga Valley. Shining Path rebels carried out an attack on three helicopters being used by an international gas pipeline consortium on 7 October, in the central region of Cusco. According to the military Joint Command spokesman, Col. Alejandro Lujan, no one was kidnapped or injured during the attack. The capture of Artemio effectively ended the war between Shining Path and the Government of Peru.

Comrade Artemio was convicted of terrorism, drug trafficking, and money laundering on 7 June 2013. He was sentenced to life in prison and a fine of $183 million. On 11 August 2013, Comrade Alipio, the Shining Path's leader in the Ene-Apurímac Valley, was killed in a battle with government forces in Llochegua.

On 9 April 2016, on the eve of the country's presidential elections, the Peruvian government blamed remnants of the Shining Path for a guerrilla attack that killed eight soldiers and two civilians. Shining Path snipers killed three police officers in the Ene Apurimac Valley on 18 March 2017.

In a document 400 pages in length recovered from a mid-level Shining Path commander and analyzed by the Counter-Terrorism Directorate (DIRCOTE) of the National Police, the Shining Path planned to initiate operations against the Government of Peru that included killings and surprise attacks beginning in 2021, the bicentennial of Peru's independence. Objectives were created to first attack public officials, then regain lost territory and then finally overthrow the government.

2020s: VRAEM stronghold 
Into the 2020s, Shining Path has existed in remaining splinter groups. The last remaining group, called the Militarized Communist Party of Peru (MPCP) of about 450 individuals remained in the Valle de los Ríos Apurímac, Ene y Mantaro (VRAEM) region, reportedly making revenue by escorting cocaine traffickers and are reportedly led by two brothers; Víctor and Jorge Quispe Palomino. The MPCP has attempted to recharacterize themselves to distance itself from the original Shining Path groups that had attacked rural communities in the area, describing Abimael Guzman as a traitor. According to InSight Crime, Shining Path's stronghold in the VRAEM, headquartered in Vizcatán, is a similar strategy as the Revolutionary Armed Forces of Colombia.

Following a five-year intelligence operation that began in 2015 and was codenamed Operation Olimpo, 71 alleged members of the Shining Path's United Front and People's Guerrilla Army were arrested on 2 December 2020. Alfredo Crespo, the secretary general of MOVADEF and Guzmán's former lawyer, was included among those arrested. Operation Olimpo included 752 military personnel and 98 government prosecutors that utilized evidence obtained through wiretapping, undercover agents and surveillance. Those arrested were charged with operating shell operations to initiate terrorist activities in Callao and Lima.

Ideology 
The official ideology of the Shining Path ceased to be "Marxism–Leninism–Mao Tse-tung thought" and it was instead referred to as "Marxism–Leninism–Maoism–Gonzalo thought" – according to some authors as the organization grew in power, a cult of personality grew around Guzmán.

The Shining Path declared itself to be feminist and many women took up leadership positions. In the organisation, 40% of the fighters and 50% of the members of its Central Committee were women.

Use of violence 
Although the reliability of reports regarding the Shining Path's actions remains a matter of controversy in Peru, the organization's use of violence is well documented. According to InSight Crime, Shining Path would kill their opponents "with assassinations, bombings, beheadings and massacres" as well as "stoning victims to death, or placing them in boiling water".

The Shining Path rejected the concept of human rights; a Shining Path document stated:

After the collapse of the Fujimori government, interim President Valentín Paniagua established a Truth and Reconciliation Commission to investigate the conflict. The Commission found in its 2003 Final Report that 69,280 people died or disappeared between 1980 and 2000 as a result of the armed conflict. The Shining Path was found to be responsible for about 54% of the deaths and disappearances reported to the commission. A statistical analysis of the available data led the Truth and Reconciliation Commission to estimate that the Shining Path was responsible for the death or disappearance of 31,331 people, 46% of the total deaths and disappearances. According to a summary of the report by Human Rights Watch, "Shining Path... killed about half the victims, and roughly one-third died at the hands of government security forces... The commission attributed some of the other slayings to a smaller guerrilla group and local militias. The rest remain unattributed." The MRTA was held responsible for 1.5% of the deaths. A 2019 study disputed the casualty figures from the Truth and Reconciliation Commission, estimating instead "a total of 48,000 killings, substantially lower than the TRC estimate", and concluding that "the Peruvian State accounts for a significantly larger share than the Shining Path."

Violence against LGBT people 

The Shining Path has been accused of violence against LGBT people. Between 1989 and 1992, the Shining Path and the MRTA killed up to 500 "non-heterosexual" people. According to one woman who was kidnapped by the Shining Path in 1981, a homosexual man's penis was cut into pieces before he was murdered. The Peruvian government did not reveal the name of the victim. The Shining Path defended its actions by saying that LGBT individuals were not killed because of their sexual identity, instead, they were killed because of their "degrading and promiscuous practices" and "the people" requested that they be executed. These killings continued throughout the twentieth century.

The Shining Path has denied such allegations, stating, "It is probable that the PCP has executed a homosexual, but rest assured that it was not done because of their sexual orientation but because of their position against the revolution.... Our view is that homosexual orientation is not an ideological matter but one of individual preference.... Party membership is open to all those who support the cause of communist revolution and the principles of Marxism-Leninism-Maoism, Gonzalo Thought, regardless of what their sexual preferences may be."

The Militarized Communist Party of Peru (MPCP), a splinter of the Shining Path, killed 18 people (ten men, six women and two children) in San Miguel del Ene, a rural area in the Vizcatán del Ene District of Satipo Province, on 23 May 2021. The Ministry of Defense said that the attack was perpetrated by the Shining Path faction led by Comrade José. It gave the death toll of 14 people. Along with the corpses, some of which were burned, leaflets signed by the MPCP were found, featuring the hammer and sickle and defining the attack as a social cleansing operation. According to the leaflets found in the attack location, the perpetrators call upon to "clean VRAEM and Peru" of outcasts, "parasites and corrupts" as well as "homosexuals, lesbians, drug addicts" and "thieves".

In popular culture 
American hard rock band Guns N' Roses quotes a speech by a Shining Path officer in their 1990 song "Civil War", as saying "We practice selective annihilation of mayors and government officials, for example, to create a vacuum, then we fill that vacuum. As popular war advances, peace is closer."

American rock band Rage Against the Machine released a music video for their 1993 song "Bombtrack" as a response to the arrest of Abimael Guzman the previous year. The video expresses support for Guzman and the Shining Path, featuring various clips of the organization's activities, as well as showing the band in a cage to mimic Guzman's imprisonment.

See also 
 Definitions of terrorism
 List of designated terrorist groups

References

Citations

Sources 

 Comisión de la Verdad y Reconciliación (2003). "Informe Final". Lima: CVR. 
 Comisión de la Verdad y Reconciliación (2003). "La verdad después del silencio (Informe final tomo 6)". Lima. Perú
 Courtois, Stephane (1999). The Black Book of Communism: Crimes, Terror, Repression. Harvard University Press.
 Crenshaw, Martha, "Theories of Terrorism: Instrumental and Organizational Approaches" in: Inside Terrorist Organizations, (ed. David Rapoport), 2001. Franck Cass, London
 Degregori, Carlos Iván (1998). "Harvesting Storms: Peasant Rondas and the Defeat of Sendero Luminoso in Ayacucho". In Steve Stern (Ed.), Shining and Other Paths: War and Society in Peru, 1980–1995. Durham and London: Duke University Press. . .
 
 Isbell, Billie Jean (1994). "Shining Path and Peasant Responses in Rural Ayacucho". In Shining Path of Peru, ed. David Scott Palmer. 2nd Edition. New York: St. Martin's Press. 
 Koppel, Martin. Peru's 'Shining Path' Evolution of a Stalinist Sect (1994)
 Laqueur, W. (1999). The new terrorism: Fanaticism and the arms of mass destruction. New York: Oxford University Press.
 Lovell, Julia. Maoism: A Global History (2019) pp. 306–346 on Peru.
 Martín-Baró, I. (1988) El Salvador 1987. Estudios Centroamericanos (ECA), No. 471-472, pp. 21–45.
 
 
 Starn, Orin. "Maoism in the Andes: The Communist Party of Peru-Shining Path and the refusal of history." Journal of Latin American Studies 27.2 (1995): 399–421. online
 Starn, Orin and Miguel La Serna, The Shining Path: Love, Madness, and Revolution in the Andes. New York: W.W. Norton, 2019.

Fictional depictions 
 The Vision of Elena Silves: A Novel by Nicholas Shakespeare
 The Dancer Upstairs: A Novel by Nicholas Shakespeare, .
 The Dancer Upstairs movie listing from the Internet Movie Database
 Detective First Grade, by Dan Mahoney, .
 Edge of the City, by Dan Mahoney, .
 Strange Tunnels Disappearing by Gary Ley, .
 The Evening News, by Arthur Hailey, .
 Death in the Andes, by Mario Vargas Llosa, .
 The Road Back Home (El camino de regreso) by José de Piérola, 
 A Kiss from Hell (Un beso del infierno) by José de Piérola, 
 Paper Dove (Paloma de Papel) movie listing from the Internet Movie Database
 La Trinchera Luminosa del Presidente Gonzalo
 War Cries, a first-season episode of JAG.
 Corner of the Dead by Lynn Lurie, University of Massachusetts Press (winner of the Juniper Prize for Fiction)
 Escape from L.A. a movie starring Kurt Russell
 Red April: a novel by Santiago Roncagliolo
 The Intelligent Homosexual's Guide to Capitalism and Socialism with a Key to the Scriptures, a play by Tony Kushner

External links 
 The People's War in Perú Archive – Information about the Communist Party of Perú (PCP) Shining Path's official website until 1998
 Article by Caretas comparing Tarata to the 9/11 attack by Al Qaeda
 Article in PDF about the Tarata Car Bomb by the Shining Path
 New 'Shining Path' threat in Peru, on the April 2004 interview with Artemio
 Shining Path communiqués on the web site of the "Partido Comunista de España [Maoista]" 
 Report of the (CVR) Truth and Reconciliation Commission (PDF) 
 Report of the (CVR) Truth and Reconciliation Commission (HTML) 
 Terrorism Research Center list of Terrorist Organizations.
 The assassination of Maria Elena Moyano
 Peru: The killings of Lucanamarca BBC, 14 October 2006
 Committee to Support the Revolution in Peru
 Peru and the Capture of Abimael Guzman, Congressional Record, (Senate—2 October 1992)
 The Search for Truth: The Declassified Record on Human Rights Abuses in Peru. Edited by Tamara Feinstein, Director, Peru Documentation Project

 
1960s establishments in Peru
Anti-revisionist organizations
Anti-imperialist organizations
Banned communist parties
Communist parties in Peru
Entities added to the Consolidated List by Australia
Internal conflict in Peru
Maoism in South America
Maoist parties
Organized crime groups in Peru
Organisations designated as terrorist by the European Union
Organisations designated as terrorist by Japan
Organizations based in Latin America designated as terrorist
Organizations based in South America designated as terrorist
Organizations designated as terrorist by the United States
Organisations designated as terrorist by New Zealand
Organizations established in the 1960s
Rebel groups in Peru
Terrorism in Peru
Organizations designated as terrorist by Canada